Krini is a village in the Patras municipality.

References

Populated places in Achaea
Messatida